Stratego is a 1990 video game published by Accolade.

Gameplay
Stratego is a digitized version of the Stratego board game presented as a computer solitaire strategy game. This adaptation does make available different designs for the playing pieces and game board.  This includes only three alternate boards and one alternate set of pieces, but does not allow players to design their own.

The game includes a demo game to show players how the game works.  The game only allows a single human player to play against the computer, with no multiplayer option.  The game includes five skill levels, from sergeant to field marshal. The game also includes multiple optional rules, such as aggressor advantage (attacking piece wins in case of a tie instead of mutual destruction), silent defense (defending piece is not revealed on an unsuccessful attack), and rescue (allows a captured piece to be reintroduced when one player reaches the opponent's end of the board).

Reception

Alan Emrich reviewed the game for Computer Gaming World, and stated that the game "remains an extremely challenging solitaire game of remarkable diversity and subtlety" and credited the supplement to the rules and the artificial intelligence opponent.

Tom Malcom for .info rated the game 3 stars and recommended the game, but suggested that fans should be prepared to be somewhat disappointed.

Ian Wrigley for Amiga Format rated the game 81% and stated that while the game remains the same as the board game, "some of the strategic twists it throws are sweet, if costly to your side".

Zzap! rated the game 76% overall and stated that the game would demand the full attention of players and that intelligent players should give it a try.

Colin Campbell for Amiga Power rated the game 52% and felt that the board game was trapped by its own design but cautioned that Accolade should have realized this before deciding to adapt it into a computer game.

Arnie Katz for VideoGames & Computer Entertainment gave the game 9 out of 10 overall and stated that even without elements like multiple perspectives and animations found in adaptations of strategy board games like chess, "the computerized Stratego is an outstanding electronic board game."

Jonathan Turner for Strategy Plus recommended Stratego to inexperienced players, or players looking for a strategic challenge that was not too difficult, but that expert players may find it too easy.

Reviews
ASM (Aktueller Software Markt) - Jan, 1991
ASM (Aktueller Software Markt) - Jan, 1992

References

1990 video games
Amiga games
Atari ST games
Classic Mac OS games
Commodore 64 games
Computer wargames
DOS games
Napoleonic Wars video games
NEC PC-9801 games
Turn-based strategy video games
Video games based on board games
Video games developed in the United States